Otto III of Bergau (died 1414), also known as Otto the Elder of Bergau, was a Bohemian nobleman, high-ranking provincial official, and political opponent of Wenceslaus IV of Bohemia.

Biography
He held the office of Highest Burgrave of the Kingdom of Bohemia from 1388 to 1393.

During his lifetime, Otto and his son, Otto IV of Bergau, acquired further estates including Trosky Castle, Hrubý Rohozec, Zbiroh, and parts of Jirkov and Turnov.

References

14th-century births
1414 deaths
15th-century Bohemian people
Medieval Bohemian nobility